KBEU (92.7 FM) is a radio station licensed to serve the community of Bearden, Arkansas. The station is owned by Radio Works, Inc. It airs a news/talk radio format.

The station was assigned the KBEU call letters by the Federal Communications Commission on November 14, 2013.

References

External links
 Official Website
 

BEU
Radio stations established in 2015
2015 establishments in Arkansas
News and talk radio stations in the United States
Ouachita County, Arkansas